The 1934 Major League Baseball season was contested from April 17 to October 9, 1934. The St. Louis Cardinals and Detroit Tigers were the regular season champions of the National League and American League, respectively. The Cardinals then defeated the Tigers in the World Series, four games to three.

Awards and honors

Most Valuable Player:
American League: Mickey Cochrane, Detroit Tigers, C
National League: Dizzy Dean, St. Louis Cardinals, P

MLB statistical leaders

1 American League Triple Crown Batting Winner

2 American League Triple Crown Pitching Winner

Standings

American League

National League

Postseason

Bracket

Managers

American League

National League

Home Field Attendance

Events
June 6 – Myril Hoag of the New York Yankees hits six singles against the Boston Red Sox. 
June 9: In the eighth inning of their game against the Boston Red Sox, the Washington Senators hit 5 consecutive doubles – the most ever hit consecutively in an inning.
July 8: In the course of the Philadelphia Athletics–Boston Red Sox game, Athletics player Bob Johnson hits a fly ball off Red Sox pitcher Hank Johnson, which is caught by center fielder Roy Johnson
July 10: At the All-Star Game held at the Polo Grounds in New York City, New York Giants pitcher Carl Hubbell strikes out five consecutive American League batters. These batters are Babe Ruth, Lou Gehrig, Jimmie Foxx, Al Simmons, and Joe Cronin: all future Hall-of-Famers.

References

External links
1934 Major League Baseball season schedule at Baseball Reference

 
Major League Baseball seasons